Sir James Tylney-Long, 7th Baronet (1736 – 28 November 1794) was an English politician who sat in the House of Commons for 32 years from 1762 to 1794.

The eldest son of Sir Robert Long, 6th Baronet and his wife Emma Child, he succeeded his father as the 7th Baronet on 10 February 1767, and inherited the family estates, including the manors of Draycot (Wiltshire) and Athelhampton (Dorset).

Career 
He was a member of the Wiltshire Militia, gaining the rank of captain in 1759 and major in 1769, and later formed the Draycot Troop of Yeomanry Cavalry.

In 1784 he inherited the estates of Wanstead, and Tylney Hall from his uncle John Tylney, 2nd Earl Tylney, and Sir James took the additional name of Tylney. He became a generous benefactor of public and private charities, living a modest and unassuming lifestyle.

He was Member of Parliament for Marlborough (1762–1780), for Devizes (1780–1788) and elected for Wiltshire in 1788, replacing the late Charles Penruddocke.

He added a new south front, and east and west wings around the core of the medieval manor house of Draycot.

Family 

In 1775 Long married firstly, Harriot, fourth daughter of Jacob Bouverie, 1st Viscount Folkestone. She died on 12 November 1777 childless. He married in 1785 Lady Catherine Sydney Windsor, daughter of Other Windsor, 4th Earl of Plymouth.

He died at his home Draycot House on 29 November 1794. His wife, Lady Catherine, died in 1823. Their only son, also called James, was born two months before his father's death and became the 8th Baronet. A sickly child, he died on 14 September 1805 just short of his eleventh birthday, and the great estates of the Long, Child and Tylney families devolved chiefly onto the eldest of the 7th Baronet's three daughters, Catherine. The Baronetcy became extinct and Catherine's marriage to spendthrift, high-stakes gambler and adulterous William Pole-Tylney-Long-Wellesley, 4th Earl of Mornington saw the destruction of Wanstead House, Wanstead, Essex (now London), but also produced their son who settled the remaining estates on his first cousin the 2nd Earl Cowley.

References

Further reading 
 Inheriting the Earth: The Long Family's 500 Year Reign in Wiltshire; Cheryl Nicol
 Hand of Fate. The History of the Longs, Wellesleys and the Draycot Estate in Wiltshire. Tim Couzens 2001 

1736 births
1794 deaths
Members of the Parliament of Great Britain for Wiltshire
Baronets in the Baronetage of England
Tory MPs (pre-1834)
Members of the Parliament of Great Britain for English constituencies
British MPs 1761–1768
British MPs 1768–1774
British MPs 1774–1780
British MPs 1780–1784
British MPs 1784–1790
British MPs 1790–1796
James Tylney-Long, 7th Baronet, Sir
British Militia officers